Dillingen is a village in the commune of Beaufort, in eastern Luxembourg.  , the village has a population of 159.

Beaufort, Luxembourg
Villages in Luxembourg